SAM Site is a historic archaeological site located near Cayce, Lexington County, South Carolina. The South Appalachian Mississippian site was the site of a late-prehistoric village.

It was listed on the National Register of Historic Places in 1978.

References 

Archaeological sites on the National Register of Historic Places in South Carolina
Buildings and structures in Lexington County, South Carolina
National Register of Historic Places in Lexington County, South Carolina